Xi District is a district of Panzhihua, Sichuan province, China.

, it has six subdistricts and one town under its administration:
Subdistricts
Qingxiangping Subdistrict
Yuquan Subdistrict
Hemenkou Subdistrict
Taojiadu Subdistrict
Dabaoding Subdistrict

Towns
Geliping

References

Districts of Sichuan
Panzhihua